Flt Lt Lawrence Frederic Pereira (10 June 1945 – 14 December 1971) was an Indian air force officer. He was the recipient of the Vir Chakra, India's gallantry award presented for acts of bravery in the battlefield.

Air Force career
Pereira began his training on 10 March 1963 at Air Force Administrative College in Coimbatore. He was commissioned on 10 August 1964, in the 80/90th Pilots course. Lawrie attended several training programs, courses and posting. The first posting to a fighter squadron after his commissioning was to No.220 Squadron at Pune.  He actively participated in 1965 war with Pakistan. After this he was posted to a Gnat Fighter Unit. He was promoted to Flight Lieutenant in 1968 and trained on the Sukhoi-7 beginning in 1970. He was posted to  Adampur Air Force Base and later to No. 26 Squadron IAF.

Vir Chakra
The citation for the Vir Chakra awarded to him reads:

References

1945 births
1971 deaths
Indian Air Force officers
Recipients of the Vir Chakra